is a role-playing video game for the Dreamcast console. It is a sequel to Evolution: The World of Sacred Device.  It was developed by Sting and published by Ubi Soft in North America. In Japan it was published by ESP, while in Taiwan a Windows version was published by Dysin Interactive Corp.

Evolution 2: Far Off Promise was also released for the European market in 2001 as one of the last European Dreamcast games. In the UK the game was exclusive to the video game chain Game.

Like the first Evolution game, Evolution 2 is a dungeon crawler. Unlike the first, Evolution 2 has both random and predetermined dungeon maps.

This game and Evolution: The World of the Sacred Device were remade into Evolution Worlds on the GameCube.

Plot
Continuing from Evolution: The World of Sacred Device, Mag Launcher and company venture towards the continent's center via the newly built railroad. With a new set of ruins to explore, Mag has the opportunity to become the greatest adventurer in the world, but a new presence threatens to destroy his relationship with Linear.

Reception

The game received "average" reviews according to the review aggregation website GameRankings. Jeff Lundrigan of Next Generation called it "an experience to be savored and enjoyed." In Japan, Famitsu gave it a score of 29 out of 40.

References

External links

1999 video games
Dreamcast games
Dreamcast-only games
Entertainment Software Publishing games
Role-playing video games
Single-player video games
Sting Entertainment games
Ubisoft games
Video game sequels
Video games developed in Japan
Video games scored by Masaharu Iwata